Good Sunday is a South Korean reality-variety show shown on the SBS network, which competes directly against MBC's Sunday Night and KBS2's Happy Sunday line-up. The program has suffered from the competition of Happy Sunday and Sunday Night but reached its way to #1 on the Top 20 Charts every Sunday. Good Sunday consists of a line-up of "corner programs", or segments, which air within the program. The program ended on March 19, 2017, opting for individual programs divided into two parts for inserting commercials (which is not allowed for programs on terrestrial television).

History 
Prior to Good Sunday, Ultra Sunday Hurray! (초특급 일요일만세) began airing on March 18, 2001. Beginning on January 20, 2002 Show! Sunday World (쇼!일요천하) aired, and on July 14, 2002 Beautiful Sunday (뷰티풀 선데이) aired until March 28, 2004, where Good Sunday began to air its new, popular programming. As of July 11, 2010, the program began airing in high definition for the first time. (Only Part 1, Running Man, aired in HD as Part 2, Family Outing 2, which still aired in SD, was airing its last episode.) As of July 18, 2010, both Part 1 and 2 (Running Man and Heroes) air in HD. Good Sunday was divided into two parts, from July 27, 2008 to May 8, 2011. On May 22, 2011, it returned to airing as one "whole" program beginning at 5:20 pm KST and ending at 8:00 pm for about 160 minutes. As of September 25, 2011, Good Sunday is divided into two parts again, Part 1 airing at 5:20 pm and Part 2 airing at 6:50 pm KST, in an effort to boost ratings. On December 4, 2011, it returned to airing as one whole program again beginning at 5:00 pm for about 180 minutes.

Broadcasting times 
 March 28, 2004 - October 29, 2006 (17:50 - 20:00 ; 2 hours 10 minutes)
 November 5, 2006 - November 4, 2007 (17:30 - 18:40 ; 1 hour 10 minutes)
 November 11, 2007 - May 18, 2008 (17:30 - 20:00 ; 2 hours 30 minutes)
 May 25, 2008 – August 21, 2011 (17:20 - 20:00 ; 2 hours 40 minutes)
 July 27, 2008 - July 11, 2010; March 20, 2011 – May 8, 2011 (17:20 - 18:40 ; 1 hour 20 minutes ; Part 1)
 July 27, 2008 - May 23, 2010; July 11, 2010; March 20, 2011 – May 1, 2011 (18:50 - 20:00 ; 1 hour 10 minutes ; Part 2)
 July 18, 2010 – March 13, 2011 (17:20 - 18:35 ; 1 hour 15 minutes ; Part 1)
 July 18, 2010 – March 13, 2011 (18:45 - 20:00 ; 1 hour 15 minutes ; Part 2)
 August 28, 2011 – December 4, 2011 (17:05 - 20:00 ; 2 hours 55 minutes)
 September 25 - November 27, 2011 (17:05 - 18:30 ; 1 hour 25 minutes ; Part 1)
 September 25 - November 27, 2011 (18:40 - 20:00 ; 1 hour 20 minutes ; Part 2)
 December 11, 2011 - November 11, 2012 (17:00 - 20:00 ; 3 hours)
 November 18, 2012 – November 17, 2013 (16:55 - 20:00 ; 3 hours 5 minutes)
 November 24, 2013 - April 13, 2014 (16:40 - 20:00 ; 3 hours 20 minutes)
 May 4 - August 17, 2014 (16:10 - 20:00 ; 3 hours 50 minutes)
 August 24, 2014 – March 19, 2017 (16:50 - 20:00 ; 3 hours 10 minutes)
 March 20, 2016 - March 19, 2017 (16:50 - 18:25 ; 1 hour 35 minutes ; Part 1)
 March 20, 2016 - March 19, 2017 (18:30 - 20:00 ; 1 hour 30 minutes ; Part 2)

Former segments

Running Man 

 Aired: Ongoing
 Starring: Yoo Jae-suk, Haha, Ji Suk-jin, Kim Jong-kook, Lee Kwang-soo, Song Ji-hyo, Kang Gary, Yang Se-chan, Jeon So-min
Running Man (Korean: 런닝맨), first broadcast on July 11, 2010, is currently the longest-running program on Good Sunday surpassing X-man on February 3, 2013 with 410 episodes so far. It has garnered attention as being the come-back program for Yoo Jae-suk after leaving Good Sunday'''s Family Outing in February 2010. This show is classified as a game-variety show, where the MCs and guests complete missions in a landmark to win a race.

 Flower Crew 

 Aired: November 27, 2016 – March 19, 2017
 Starring: Seo Jang-hoon, Jo Se-ho, Ahn Jung-hwan, Yoo Byung-jae, Kang Seung-yoon (Winner), Lee Sung-jaeFlower Crew (Korean: 꽃놀이패) is filled with travel experiences of the six characters whose luck and fate depend on the live votes of the audience make it more unique, suspense and unpredictable outcome to story line and cast member's fate in decided the group. First broadcast as the pilots on July 15 and 16, 2016, the program was picked up and began airing on Monday night at 23:10 (KST) from September 5 to November 21, 2016, then it changed the broadcast time to 16:50 (KST) and replacing Fantastic Duo starting November 27, 2016.

 Fantastic Duo 

Aired: April 17, 2016 - November 20, 2016
 Starring: Jun Hyun-moo, Various SingersFantastic Duo (Korean: 판타스틱 듀오) is a competition program featuring singers collaborating with ordinary people. First broadcast as a pilot on February 9, 2016, the program was picked up and aired from April 17 to November 20, 2016, replacing K-pop Star 5.

 K-pop Star 5 
 Aired: November 22, 2015 - April 10, 2016
 Starring: Jun Hyun-moo, Park Jin-young, Yang Hyun-suk, You Hee-yeolSurvival Audition K-pop Star 5 (Korean: 서바이벌 오디션 K팝스타 4) is the fifth season of audition program K-pop Star, with returning judges Park Jin-young, Yang Hyun-suk, and You Hee-yeol. The program returned for a new season on November 22, 2016, replacing Take Care of My Dad.

 Take Care of My Dad 

 Aired: April 26 - November 1, 2015
 Starring: Lee Kyung-kyu, Kang Seok-woo, Cho Jae-hyun, Jo Min-kiTake Care of My Dad (Korean: 아빠를 부탁해) was a reality program featuring celebrity fathers who do not express themselves much and their daughters interacting in daily life. First broadcast on February 20, 2015, the program moved to Good Sunday beginning April 26, 2015, replacing K-pop Star 4.

 K-pop Star 4 
 Aired: November 23, 2014 - April 19, 2015
 Starring: Jun Hyun-moo, Park Jin-young, Yang Hyun-suk, You Hee-yeolSurvival Audition K-pop Star 4 (Korean: 서바이벌 오디션 K팝스타 4) is the fourth season of audition program K-pop Star, with returning judges Park Jin-young, Yang Hyun-suk, and You Hee-yeol. The program returned for a new season on November 23, 2014, replacing Roommate.

 Roommate 
 Aired: May 4 – November 16, 2014 (in Good Sunday)
 Starring: Chan-yeol, Hong Soo-hyun, Park Bom, Jo Se-ho, Lee Dong-wook, Lee So-ra, Nana, Park Min-woo, Seo Kang-joon, Shin Sung-woo, Song Ga-yeonRoommate (Korean: 룸메이트) is a reality program featuring eleven celebrities living together, sharing common spaces such as the kitchen, living room, and washrooms. The program aims to show the life, troubles, and joys of eleven different celebrities as they form friendships and possibly enemies living together under one roof. Roommate replaces K-pop Star 3 and began airing on May 4, 2014. With the return of K-pop Star to Good Sunday, Roommate moved to airing every Tuesday at 11:15 pm as a stand-alone program starting November 25, 2014.

 K-pop Star 3 
 Aired: November 24, 2013 – April 13, 2014
 Starring: Jun Hyun-moo, Park Jin-young, Yang Hyun-suk, You Hee-yeolSurvival Audition K-pop Star 3 (Korean: 서바이벌 오디션 K팝스타 3) is the third season of audition program K-pop Star, with returning judges Park Jin-young and Yang Hyun-suk, and new judge You Hee-yeol. The program returned for a new season on November 24, 2013, replacing Barefooted Friends.

 Barefooted Friends 
 Aired: April 21 – November 17, 2013
 Starring: Kang Ho-dong, Yoon Jong-shin, Kim Bum-soo, Kim Hyun-joong, Yoon Shi-yoon, Eunhyuk, UeeBarefooted Friends (Korean: 맨발의 친구들) is a real variety program featuring Kang Ho-dong, who is returning to Good Sunday after leaving X-Man in April 2007. The members travel to foreign countries to experience "real happiness" with locals. The program first broadcast on April 21, 2013, replacing K-pop Star 2.

 K-pop Star 2 
 Aired: November 18, 2012 – April 14, 2013
 Starring: Yoon Do-hyun, Boom, BoA, Park Jin-young, Yang Hyun-sukSurvival Audition K-pop Star 2 (Korean: 서바이벌 오디션 K팝스타 2) is the second season of audition program K-pop Star, with returning judges, BoA, Park Jin-young, and Yang Hyun-suk. The program returned for a new season on November 18, 2012, replacing Law of the Jungle 2. The program was renewed for a third season with the same judges, scheduled to air in October 2013 possibly in a new timeslot.

 Kim Byung-man's Law of the Jungle 2 
 Aired: May 6 – November 11, 2012 (in Good Sunday)
 Starring: Kim Byung-man and other cast members of the trip in Vanuatu, Siberia and MadagascarKim Byung-man's Law of the Jungle 2 (Korean: 김병만의 정글의 법칙 시즌2) is a reality-documentary program featuring comedian Kim Byung-man and his tribe as they explore and survive in nature. With locations being in Vanuatu, Siberia in Russia, and Madagascar. This is the second season of Kim Byung-man's Law of the Jungle, which was a ratings success in its Friday night time slot in the latter half of 2011. The program began to air on May 6, 2012, replacing K-pop Star., but its last episode was reverted to Friday at 10:00 pm, to make way for K-pop Star 2, where its next season has aired in that time slot ever since.

 K-pop Star 
 Aired: December 4, 2011 – April 29, 2012
 Starring: Yoon Do-hyun, Boom, BoA, Park Jin-young, Yang Hyun-sukSurvival Audition K-pop Star (Korean: 서바이벌 오디션 K팝스타) is an audition program featuring the "Big 3" entertainment companies (SM, YG, and JYP). People around the world audition to become the next "K-pop Star", who will be judged by a representative of each company (BoA, Park Jin-young, and Yang Hyun-suk). The winner will have a choice of which company to sign with, and many prizes including three hundred million won. The first season began to air on December 4, 2011, replacing BIGsTORY. The program was renewed for a second season with the same judges and an upgraded format, and aired from November 2012 to April 2013.

 BIGsTORY 
 Aired: August 28 – November 27, 2011
 Starring: Shin Dong-yup, Lee Soo-kyung, Shin Bong-sun, Lee Kyu-han, Sean LeeDiet Survival BIGsTORY (Korean: 다이어트 서바이벌 빅토리) is a new survival program featuring "Diet King", Sean Lee. Twenty obese people will go through intense training and diets to "change your body, change your life". The winner will receive one hundred million won, a car, and many fabulous prizes. The title "BIGsTORY" which sounds like "victory" in Korean, means the "big" "story" these people have come from and will make, and the "victory" they will achieve. The program began to air on August 28, 2011, replacing Kim Yu-na's Kiss & Cry.

 Kim Yuna's Kiss & Cry 
 Aired: May 22, 2011 – August 21, 2011
 Starring: Kim Yuna, Shin Dong-yup, IU, Jin Ji-hee, Kim Byung-man, Krystal, Lee Ah-hyun, Lee Kyou-hyuk, Park Joon-geum, Seo Ji-seok, Son Dam-bi, U-Know Yun-hoKim Yuna's Kiss & Cry (Korean: 김연아의 키스 앤 크라이) is a survival audition program featuring champion figure skater, Kim Yuna. Ten celebrities and ten professional skaters will form couples and challenge each other in figure skating to become the winning team, who will be performing with Kim Yuna at a special ice show in August. The program is scheduled to air on May 22, 2011, replacing Heroes. The program was scheduled to return for a second season in April 2012 in a different time slot, but has been postponed due to Kim Yuna's busy schedule.

 Heroes 
 Aired: July 18, 2010 – May 1, 2011
 Starring: Noh Hong-chul, Lee Hwi-jae, Noh Sa-yeon, Ji-yeon, Seo In-young, Kahi, Hong Soo-ah, Lee Jin, Shin Bong-sun, IU, Yoo In-na, Nicole Jung, Narsha, Jung Ga-eunHeroes (Korean: 영웅호걸; Hanja: 英雄豪傑) is a girl-group variety show that first aired on July 18, 2010, replacing Gold Miss is Coming. It is classified as a "popularity search variety", where the female celebrities compete to find out which of them is more popular among citizens. The show ended on May 1, 2011 due to low ratings and has been replaced by Kiss & Cry.

 Family Outing 2 
 Aired: February 21, 2010 – July 11, 2010
 Starring: Kim Won-hee, Yoon Sang-hyun, Ji Sang-ryeol, Shin Bong-sun, Yoona, Ok Taecyeon, Jo Kwon, Kim Heechul, Jang Dong-minFamily Outing Season 2 (Korean: 패밀리가 떴다 2) (literally Family's Here 2) was the second season of Family Outing. It featured a different concept, cast, and production team, but ended due to low ratings.

 Gold Miss is Coming 
 Aired: October 12, 2008 – June 6, 2010
 Starring: Noh Hong-chul, Yang Jung-a, Lee In-hae, Song Eun-i, Park So-hyun, Shin Bong-sun, Hyun Young, Seo Yu-jungGold Miss is Coming (Korean: 골드미스가 간다) (also known as Gold Miss Diaries) is a reality show where 6 "Gold Misses" are on a mission to find a husband. They will live with each other for 2 days in the "Gold House" and through games, whoever that wins will have an opportunity to date someone.

 Family Outing 
 Aired: June 15, 2008 – February 14, 2010
 Starring: Yoo Jae-suk, Lee Hyo-ri, Yoon Jong-shin, Kim Su-ro, Kang Dae-sung, Kim Jong-kook, Park Si-yeon, Park Hae-jin, Park Ye-jin, Lee Chun-heeFamily Outing (Korean: 패밀리가 떴다) (literally Family's Here) was first broadcast on June 15, 2008, it has yet since become the top rated program on Sunday. The second season began on February 21, 2010. Family Outing is a reality show, where the "Family," consisting of Korean celebrities and entertainers. goes to an elderlys home in the countrysides of South Korea and takes care of the home while the elderly family goes on a vacation. During their stay, the "Family" takes on tasks assigned by the elderly family. During the tasks, the Family will play games related to the surroundings. They will also cook dinner and breakfast for themselves during their stay. A "Popular Vote" game was played before they go to bed, as to where the members of the family will sleep but is seen not doing it anymore. At the end of their stay, the elderly family will return to the home and be greeted by the Family as they will move on to their next destination.

 Change 
 Aired: February 17, 2008 – October 15, 2008
 Starring: Shin Dong-yup, Shin Bong-sun, Kang-in, Noh Hong-chulChange (Korean: 체인지) is a program where celebrities are given a "new face", and are sent to live through a day as a different person.

 Find Mr. Kim 
 Aired: February 10, 2008 – February 24, 2008
 Starring: Seo Kyung-suk, Yoon Jung-su, Kim Sung-su, Moon Hee-jun, Alex, CharlesFind Mr. Kim (Korean: 김서방을 찾아라) is a program about delivering packages to people around the world.

 Meet the In-Laws 
 Aired: November 11, 2007 – July 20, 2008
 Starring: Nam Hee-seok, Han YoungMeet the In-Laws (Korean: 사돈 처음 뵙겠습니다) is a program about foreign brides meeting their in-laws and family members for the first time.

 Mission Impossible 
 Aired: November 11, 2007 – June 8, 2008
 Starring: Yoo Jae-suk, Shin Jung-hwan, Yoon Jong-shinMission Impossible (Korean: 기적의 승부사/기승史) (also known as Miraculous Victory and Defeat) is a program where two teams, one team of celebrities and one team of announcers, complete tasks with 10 chances to succeed. Due to poor ratings, it was changed to "기승史", a historical costume program, with a concept of two teams competing for fun.

 Explorers of the Human Body 
 Aired: November 11, 2007 – February 3, 2008
 Starring: Shin Dong-yup, Super JuniorExplorers of the Human Body (Korean: 인체탐험대) features Super Junior, as they investigate parts of the human body. Due to Super Junior's busy schedule, the show was canceled after a plan to air a second season. Explorers of the Human Body was one of the highest rating shows to appear in the line-up due to comical and educational content.

 Good Sunday Old TV 
 Aired: June 17, 2007 – November 4, 2007
 Starring: Yoo Jae-suk, Shin Jung-hwan, Yoon Jong-shin, Haha, Han Young, Kim Ju-heeOld TV (Korean: 일요일이 좋다 옛날 TV) features celebrities from the past and shows how television was broadcast back in their days. This program was the last of the short lived stand-alone 70 mins Good Sunday.

 Good Sunday Haja! Go 
 Aired: April 15, 2007 – June 10, 2007
 Starring: Yoo Jae-suk, Park Myung-su, Shin Jung-hwan, HahaHaja! GO (Korean: 일요일이 좋다 하자!GO) (literally Do It! GO) featured guests playing gag games.) Calling itself the first gag variety, the show was accused of plagiarizing a program on Fuji TV and was cancelled. This program was one of the short lived stand-alone 70 mins Good Sunday.

 New X-man Good Sunday 
 Aired: November 5, 2006 – April 8, 2007
 Starring: Yoo Jae-suk, Kang Ho-dong, Lee Hyuk-jaeNew X-man (Korean: X맨 일요일이 좋다) was a revamped version of X-man, where the X-man was decided by a survey by other celebrities on a certain topic, the team with X-man in the end would lose. This program was one of the short lived stand-alone 70 mins Good Sunday.

 Bungee Song King/S-MATCH 
 Aired: August 27, 2006 – October 29, 2006
 Starring: Tak Jae-hoon, Park Su-hong, Yoon Jung-suBungee Song King and S-MATCH (Korean: 번지 노래왕/에스-메치) were two special programs that filled in Roundly Roundly's absence.

 Roundly Roundly 
 Aired: April 30, 2006 – August 13, 2006
 Starring: Tak Jae-hoon, Park Su-hong, Yoon Jung-soo, Im Hyung-joonRoundly Roundly (Korean: 둥글게 둥글게) is a program where the hosts and guests need to think like a child and understand them more.

 X-man 
 Aired: October 10, 2004 – October 29, 2006 (in Good Sunday)
 Starring: Yoo Jae-suk, Kang Ho-dong, Lee Hyuk-jaeX-man (Korean: X맨) is one of Korea's most famous variety shows. Various celebrities collaborate into two teams and duel out against each other. The main object is to find the X-man; a randomly picked celebrity who purposely tried to sabotage his/her teammates' chances of winning.

 Reverse Drama 
 Aired: August 8, 2004 – April 23, 2006
 Starring: Various CelebritiesReverse Drama (Korean: 대결! 반전드라마/반전극장) (also known as Banjun Drama) features two mini-dramas that have "reverse" endings. The ending are generally surprising and would not be expected by the viewers. The two mini-dramas compete by votes cast on the main site.

 Yoo Jae-suk and Fullness of the Heart 
 Aired: May 30, 2004 – September 19, 2004
 Starring: Yoo Jae-suk, Shin Jung-hwan, Ji Sang-ryul, Nam Chang-hee, Kim Chong-sukYoo Jae-suk and Fullness of the Heart (Korean: 유재석과 감개무량) was the predecessor of Infinite Challenge.

 Medical Non-Fiction! Last Warning 
 Aired: May 30, 2004 – August 1, 2004
 Starring: Kang Ho-dong, Lee Hwi-jaeMedical Non-Fiction! Last Warning (Korean: 메디컬 논픽션! 최종경고) was an informational program where celebrities would reenact symptoms to inform viewers of illnesses.

 Star Olympiad 
 Aired: May 2, 2004 – May 23, 2004
 Starring: Kang Ho-dong, Lee Hwi-jaeStar Olympiad (Korean: 스타 올림피아드) was a program where teams of celebrities would compete in events.

 Healthy Men and Women 
 Aired: March 28, 2004 – April 25, 2004
 Starring: Kang Ho-dong, Lee Hwi-jae, Shin Jung-hwan, Yoo Jae-sukHealthy Men and Women (Korean: 건강남녀) was classified as a "love fantasy show", where the MCs and guests would fight for each other's love through comical acts.

 Waving the Korean Flag 
 Aired: March 28, 2004 – May 23, 2004
 Starring: Yoo Jae-suk, Ji Sang-ryulWaving the Korean Flag (Korean: 태극기 휘날리며) was a program featuring South Korea's famous athletes.

 Shin Dong-yeop's Love's Commissioned Mother 
 Aired: March 28, 2004 – October 3, 2004
 Starring: Shin Dong-yupShin Dong-yeop's Love's Commissioned Mother (Korean: 신동엽의 사랑의 위탁모) was a program where female celebrities would "adopt" child(ren) and raise them over a week. It is the predecessor to Our Children Have Changed.

 Ratings 
 2004 

 All ratings are by AGB Nielsen Media Research unless otherwise noted. Ratings with a (*) are provided by TNS Media Korea (TNmS as of January 27, 2010) where AGB is unavailable.

 2005 

 All ratings are by AGB Nielsen Media Research unless otherwise noted. Ratings with a (*) are provided by TNS Media Korea (TNmS as of January 27, 2010) where AGB is unavailable.

 2006 

 All ratings are by AGB Nielsen Media Research unless otherwise noted. Ratings with a (*) are provided by TNS Media Korea (TNmS as of January 27, 2010) where AGB is unavailable.

 2007 

 All ratings are by AGB Nielsen Media Research unless otherwise noted. Ratings with a (*) are provided by TNS Media Korea (TNmS as of January 27, 2010) where AGB is unavailable.

 2008 

 Ratings by TNS and AGB are shown where available.

 Good Sunday divides its program into two parts, Family Outing as Good Sunday Part 1 and Change as Good Sunday Part 2. Ratings by TNS and AGB are shown where available.

 2009 

 Ratings by TNS and AGB are shown where available.

 2010 

 Ratings by TNmS (TNS Media Korea prior to January 27, 2010) and AGB are shown where available.

 Good Sunday airs as a "whole" program during World Cup season.

 Good Sunday returns to dividing its program into two parts.

 2011 

 Ratings by TNmS and AGB are shown where available.

 Good Sunday returns to airing as one "whole" program.

 Good Sunday returns to dividing its program into two parts.

 Good Sunday returns to airing as one "whole" program.

 2012 

 2013 

 2014 

 2015-present 

 Awards and achievements 

 See also 
 KBS2 Happy Sunday MBC Sunday Night References 

 External links 
  (Old) Good Sunday Official Homepage
  New X-man Good Sunday Official Homepage
  Good Sunday Haja! Go Official Homepage
  Good Sunday Old TV Official Homepage
  (New) Good Sunday Official Homepage
  Kim Yu-na's Kiss & Cry Official Homepage
  BIGsTORY Official Homepage
  K-pop Star Official Homepage
  Kim Byung-man's Law of the Jungle 2 Official Homepage
  K-pop Star 2 Official Homepage on SBS The Soty''
  Barefooted Friends Official Homepage
  K-pop Star 3 Official Homepage
  Roommate Official Homepage
  K-pop Star 4 Official Homepage
  Take Care of My Dad Official Homepage
  
  
  

2010s South Korean television series
2004 South Korean television series debuts
2017 South Korean television series endings
Seoul Broadcasting System original programming
South Korean variety television shows
South Korean reality television series
Sunday mass media
Korean-language television shows